Ander Gayoso Reina (born 20 July 1993) is a Spanish professional footballer who plays for 	2ª RFEF – Group V club Talavera as a left back.

Club career
Born in Ermua, Biscay, Basque Country, Gayoso graduated with SD Eibar's youth setup, and made his debut as a senior with the reserves in 2012, in Tercera División. In July 2012, he was loaned to neighbouring CD Elgoibar, for one year.

On 23 July 2013, Gayoso joined Zamudio SD, also in the fourth tier, in a season-long loan deal. On 27 June of the following year, he signed a new two-year deal with the Armeros, and moved on loan to Segunda División B side Barakaldo CF on 4 August.

In June 2015, Gayoso was included in the Eibar's first team squad for pre-season, but suffered a severe knee injury on 4 August. Recovered from his injury in March 2016, he made his professional – and La Liga – debut on 29 April, coming on as a late substitute for Antonio Luna, in a 0–2 away loss against Sporting de Gijón.

On 13 July 2016, Gayoso was loaned to CD Tudelano in the third division, for one year.

References

External links

1993 births
Living people
People from Ermua
Spanish footballers
Footballers from the Basque Country (autonomous community)
Association football defenders
La Liga players
Segunda División B players
Tercera División players
Segunda Federación players
Zamudio SD players
Barakaldo CF footballers
CD Vitoria footballers
SD Eibar footballers
CD Tudelano footballers
Real Unión footballers
Arenas Club de Getxo footballers
UP Langreo footballers
CD Lealtad players
CP Cacereño players
CF Talavera de la Reina players
Sportspeople from Biscay